Thomas Kevin Durcan (26 August 1920 – 1998) was a Singaporean sailor. He competed in the Dragon event at the 1960 Summer Olympics.

References

External links
 

1920 births
1998 deaths
Singaporean male sailors (sport)
Olympic sailors of Singapore
Sailors at the 1960 Summer Olympics – Dragon
Sportspeople from London